Nordek (in Swedish:  Organisationen för nordiskt ekonomiskt samarbete. In Danish and Norwegian: Nordøk for Nordisk økonomi. In Finnish: Pohjoismaiden talousalue) was a planned organisation for Nordic economic cooperation similar to the European Economic Community EEC, based on a proposal in 1968 by Danish Prime Minister Hilmar Baunsgaard. A treaty was negotiated to establish the new organisation, to be headquartered in Malmö, Sweden. Ultimately, Finland did not ratify the treaty due to its relationship with the Soviet Union.  Then Denmark joined EEC and  Sweden, Norway, Iceland signed a bilateral free trade treaty with the EEC.

See also
Nordic Council

Further reading

 Jónsson, Guðmundur. 2009. “On the Sidelines: Iceland and the Nordek Negotiations, 1968–1970.” in Between Nordic Ideology, Economic Interests and Political Reality: New Perspectives on Nordek, 159–167. Helsinki: Finnish Society of Science and Lettres.
 Claes Wiklund, "The Zig-Zag Course of the Nordek Negotiations," Scandinavian Political Studies 5 (1970)

External links

Europe: A Nordic Common Market TIME16 May 1969 
A Nordic Union (That Wasn't) European Tribune, 30 March 2008
3 Die Nordek-Verhandlungen (in German) Jan Stampehl: “Ist Finnland ein nordisches Land?” Der Nordek-Prozess 1968–70 als Fallstudie

Nordic countries
Cancelled projects